The 1993 Cleveland Thunderbolts season was the 3rd season for the franchise, and their second in Cleveland, Ohio. They went 2–10 and failed to make the playoffs.

Regular season

Schedule

Standings

z – clinched homefield advantage

y – clinched division title

x – clinched playoff spot

Roster

Awards

External links
1993 Cleveland Thunderbolts at ArenaFan.com

1993 Arena Football League season
1993 in sports in Ohio
Cleveland Thunderbolts seasons